Pierre Samuel du Pont de Nemours ( or ; ; 14 December 1739 – 7 August 1817) was a French-American writer, economist, publisher and government official.  During the French Revolution, he, his two sons and their families immigrated to the United States.

His son Éleuthère Irénée du Pont was the founder of E. I. du Pont de Nemours and Company. He was the patriarch and progenitor of one of the United States's most successful and wealthiest business dynasties of the 19th and 20th centuries.

Early life and family

Pierre du Pont was born on December 14, 1739, the son of Samuel du Pont and Anne Alexandrine de Montchanin. His father was a watchmaker and French Protestant, or Huguenot. His mother was a descendant of an impoverished minor noble family from Burgundy.

Du Pont married Nicole-Charlotte Marie-Louise le Dée de Rencourt in 1766, also of a minor noble family. They had three sons: Victor Marie (1767–1827), a manufacturer and politician; Paul François (December 1769–January 1770); and Éleuthère Irénée (1771–1834), the founder of E.I. duPont de Nemours and Company in the United States. Nicole-Charlotte died 3 September 1784 of typhoid.

Ancien Régime
With a lively intelligence and high ambition, Pierre became estranged from his father, who wanted him to be a watchmaker. The younger man developed a wide range of acquaintances with access to the French court during the  period. Eventually he became the protégé of Dr. François Quesnay, the personal physician of King Louis XV's mistress, Madame de Pompadour. By the early 1760s, du Pont's writings on the national economy had drawn the attention of intellectuals such as Voltaire and Turgot. His 1768 book on physiocracy advocated low tariffs and free trade among nations, deeply influenced Adam Smith of Scotland.

He was invited in 1774 by King Stanisław August Poniatowski of the Polish–Lithuanian Commonwealth to help organize that country's educational system. The appointment to the Commission of National Education, with which he worked for several months, helped push his career forward, bringing him an appointment within the French government.

He served as French inspector general of commerce under Louis XVI.  He helped negotiate the treaty of 1783, by which Great Britain formally recognized the independence of the United States, and arranged the terms of a commercial treaty signed by France and England in 1786.

French Revolution
Du Pont initially supported the French Revolution and served as president of the National Constituent Assembly.

He and his son Eleuthère were among those who physically defended Louis XVI and Marie Antoinette from a mob besieging the Tuileries Palace in Paris during the insurrection of 10 August 1792. Condemned to the guillotine during the Reign of Terror, du Pont was awaiting execution  when Robespierre fell on 9 thermidor an IV (27 July 1794), and he was spared.

He married Françoise Robin on 5 vendémiaire  an IV (27 September 1795). Robin was the daughter of Antoine Robin de Livet, a French aristocrat who lived in Lyon, and the widow of Pierre Poivre, the noted French administrator. After du Pont's house was sacked by a mob during the events of 18 Fructidor V (4 September 1797), he, his sons and their families immigrated to the United States in 1799.

They hoped (but failed) to found a model community of French exiles.  In the United States, du Pont developed strong ties with industry and government, in particular with Thomas Jefferson, with whom he had been acquainted since at least 1787 and who had referred to him as "one of the very great men of the age" and "the ablest man in France."

Du Pont engaged in informal diplomacy between the United States and France during the reign of Napoleon.  He was the originator of an idea that eventually became the Louisiana Purchase, as a way to avoid French troops landing in New Orleans, and possibly sparking armed conflict with U.S. forces. Eventually, he would settle in the U.S. permanently; he died there in 1817.

His son Éleuthère, who had studied chemistry in France with Antoine Lavoisier, founded a gunpowder manufacturing plant, based on his experience in France as a chemist.  It would become one of the largest and most successful American corporations, known today as DuPont.

In 1800, he was elected a member of the American Philosophical Society in Philadelphia, Pennsylvania.

See also
 Du Pont family for other family members and relationships.
 Commission of National Education

References

Further reading

External links
 DuPont Company DuPont Heritage
 Pierre Samuel du Pont de Nemours papers at Hagley Museum and Library

1739 births
1817 deaths
American businesspeople
American economists
American male writers
Pierre Samuel du Pont de Nemours
Pierre Samuel du Pont de Nemours
French economists
French emigrants to the United States
French male writers
French untitled nobility
Louisiana Purchase
Members of the National Constituent Assembly (France)
Writers from Paris
People from New Castle County, Delaware
People of the French Revolution
Physiocrats
Polish educational theorists